Pierre Buyoya (24 November 1949 – 17 December 2020) was a Burundian army officer and politician who served two terms as President of Burundi in 1987 to 1993 and 1996 to 2003. He was the second-longest serving president in Burundian history.

An ethnic Tutsi, Buyoya joined the sole legal party, UPRONA and quickly rose through the ranks of the Burundian military. In 1987, he led a military coup d'état that overthrew his predecessor Jean-Baptiste Bagaza and enabled him to seize power. Leading an oppressive military junta, Hutu uprisings in 1988 led to the killings of an estimated 20,000 people. Buyoya then established a National Reconciliation Commission that created a new constitution in 1992 which allowed for a multi-party system and a non-ethnic government. Running as a candidate in the 1993 Burundian presidential election, he was defeated by Hutu candidate Melchior Ndadaye of the FRODEBU opposition party.

Ndadaye was assassinated during another attempted coup after only three months in office, leading to a series of retaliatory killings that culminated in the Burundian Civil War. During the war, Buyoya returned to power in another coup d'état in 1996. During his second presidency, he created an ethnically inclusive government by establishing a partnership with FROBEDU. This led to the 2000 Arusha Accords which introduced ethnic power sharing. He selected Domitien Ndayizeye, a Hutu as his vice-president, who succeeded him as president in 2003. The war ended two years later.

Following the end of the war, Buyoya became a senator for life under the terms of the 2004 constitution. During his post-presidency, he was also sent as an African Union envoy during peace missions in Chad and Mali. In November 2020, he was sentenced to life in prison in absentia by a Burundinan court for his suspected role in the 1993 coup attempt that assassinated Ndadaye. He died of COVID-19 two months later.

Early life
Pierre Buyoya was born in Rutovu, Bururi Province on 24 November 1949 in Belgian-administered Ruanda-Urundi. His father, Rurikumunwa, was ethnically a Tutsi-Hima of the Batyaba clan. He received a primary education at a Catholic mission in Rutovu from 1958 to 1963. He thereafter attended the Ecole moyenne pédagogique until 1967. He enlisted as an officer the Burundian Army and studied at the Royal Military Academy in Brussels, Belgium, rising to the rank of major. Academically, Buyoya studied social sciences, examined armoured cavalry, and defended a thesis concerning the Algerian National Liberation Front. Once done with his studies in Belgium, he attended the General Staff College in France from August 1976 to January 1977 and the Bundeswehr Command and Staff College in West Germany from 1980 to 1982.

Buyoya married Sophie Ntaraka in 1978, and the couple had four children. He entered the long-term single party, Union for National Progress (Union pour le Progrès national, UPRONA), and acquired a position on its Central Committee (Comité central) in 1979. He renewed his party membership in 1984. Buyoya joined the General Staff of the Army in 1982 and was made responsible for training. His rapid rise through the military hierarchy earned him the nickname "Old Man", and he was well-respected by his fellow soldiers. The New York Times reported in 1996 that "[n]o one could recall his ever telling a joke. He is often seen at soccer games and reads a lot. He eschews a uniform, though his leisure suits recall French summer khakis."

Presidency

Coup d'état and first term, 1987–1993

In September 1987, Buyoya led a military coup d'état against the regime of Jean-Baptiste Bagaza who had taken power in another coup in November 1976. He led the country as the chairman of a 31-person military committee of national safety. He proclaimed an agenda of economic liberalisation. As in previous regimes, he presided over an oppressive ruling junta consisting primarily of Tutsi. This led to a Hutu uprising in August 1988, which caused approximately 20,000 deaths. After these killings, Buyoya appointed a Commission of National Reconciliation (Commission pour la réconciliation nationale). On 9 September he was officially proclaimed President of Burundi. In early October he appointed a mixed government of both civilian and military figures and awarded himself the post of Minister of National Defence.

This commission created a new constitution that Buyoya approved in 1992. This constitution called for a non-ethnic government with a president and a parliament. Democratic elections were held in June 1993 and were won by the Hutu Melchior Ndadaye, who created a balanced Hutu and Tutsi government. Nevertheless, the army assassinated Ndadaye in a coup attempt in October 1993. Some human rights groups suspected Buyoya of supporting the putschists, while several soldiers who participated accused him of helping plan the coup. Burundi entered an prolonged period of civil war in which 300,000 people were killed and 470,000 displaced. There were numerous attempts to form a government, but even the coalition government under Sylvestre Ntibantunganya was unable to stop the fighting.

Coup d'état and second term, 1996–2003

On 25 July 1996, with strong support and backup from the army, Buyoya returned to power in a military coup, ousting interim President Ntibantunganya who had been contested by the population due to his failure to stop killings perpetrated by rebels. The civil war became less intense but continued. Economic sanctions were also imposed by the international community because of the nature of Buyoya's return to power, but were eased as Buyoya created an ethnically inclusive government. He entered a new "partnership" with the National Assembly in June 1998 which was dominated by the Hutu-backed Front for Democracy in Burundi (Front pour la Démocratie au Burundi, FRODEBU). This paved the way for the Arusha Accords in 2000 which introduced a form of ethnic power-sharing and paved the way for the end of the Civil War. Buyoya selected as his vice-president Domitien Ndayizeye, a Hutu. The conditions of the Arusha Accords required Buyoya to hand over power in 2003, which he did. Ndayizeye became the President of Burundi on 30 April, paving the way for the end of the Civil War in 2005.

Later activities
In the aftermath of the Civil War, Buyoya became a senator for life as a former head of state, per the terms of the 2004 constitution.

In his 2007 book From Bloodshed to Hope in Burundi, the former US Ambassador Robert Krueger accuses Pierre Buyoya of orchestrating the 1993 putsch which led to the murder of President Ndadaye.

Pierre Buyoya was appointed by the African Union to lead a peace mission in Chad in 2008. He was subsequently appointed to another mission in Mali. On 19 October 2020 the Supreme Court of Burundi sentenced Buyoya in absentia to life in prison for the murder of Ndadaye in 1993.

In December 2020 he contracted COVID-19 in Mali during the COVID-19 pandemic in Mali. At first he was hospitalised in Bamako but was later transferred to France and died on 17 December in Bonneuil-en-France, in an ambulance on his way to a hospital in Paris. He was buried in Bamako on 29 December 2020.

References

Works cited

External links

 Burundi Timeline 1858-1995
 1996 comments on Burundi and Buyoya at the United Nations
 

|-

1949 births
2020 deaths
People from Rutovu
Presidents of Burundi
Leaders who took power by coup
Burundian life senators
Tutsi people
Union for National Progress politicians
Deaths from the COVID-19 pandemic in France
Royal Military Academy (Belgium) alumni
African Union officials
People of the Burundian Civil War
Burundian military personnel